Amanpur  Assembly constituency is  one of the 403 constituencies of the Uttar Pradesh Legislative Assembly,  India. It is a part of the Etah district and one of  the five assembly constituencies in the Etah Lok Sabha constituency.  First election in this assembly constituency was held in 2012 after the  "Delimitation of Parliamentary and Assembly Constituencies Order,  2008" was passed and the constituency was formed in 2008. The  constituency is assigned identification number 101.

Wards 
The extent of Amanpur Assembly constituency is KCs Sahawar, Amanpur, Manpur Nagariya,  Sahawar NP & Amanpur NP of Kasganj Tehsil; PCs Mohanpur, Nagla Nahar, Amirsa, Mijkhuree Sikahara, Nagla Bheemsain, Akhatau Mangadpur, Pilakhuni, Pithanpur, Dahelee  Bujurg, Bakavalee, Tajpur, Chandpurmemada of Sidhapura KC & Mohanpur NP  of Patiyali Tehsil.

Members of the Legislative Assembly

Election results

2022

2012
16th Vidhan Sabha: 2012 Elections

See also

Etah district
Etah Lok Sabha constituency
Sixteenth Legislative Assembly of Uttar Pradesh
Uttar Pradesh Legislative Assembly
Vidhan Bhawan

References

External links
 

Assembly constituencies of Uttar Pradesh
Kasganj district
Constituencies established in 2008